Steve Green (born January 26, 1978) is a Canadian former professional baseball relief pitcher.

Career
His major league debut was on April 7, 2001, against the Oakland Athletics. He pitched 6 innings and allowed 2 runs with 4 strikeouts, 4 hits and 6 walks. In , he played for the Norfolk Tides, the Baltimore Orioles Triple-A affiliate, and, at the end of the season, decided to join the Canadian baseball team for the 2008 Olympic Baseball Qualification Tournament for the Beijing Games. After helping his national team qualify for the Olympics, Green signed a contract with the Philadelphia Phillies for the  season. He spent the entire season with the Phillies' Triple-A affiliate, the Lehigh Valley IronPigs, recording a 3.09 ERA in 35 games.

In February 2009, he signed a minor league deal with the Boston Red Sox. He was later released. On April 15, 2009, Green signed a minor league contract with the Phillies and was sent to Triple-A Lehigh Valley for a second year in a row, but got released by the Phillies soon after and had surgery, putting an end to his 2009 season.

In 2010, Green signed a contract with the Québec Capitales of the Can-Am League but his contract is terminated after an argument with the coaching staff. He then joined the Acton Vale Castors, in the Ligue de Baseball Senior Élite du Québec.

External links
, or Retrosheet
Olympics at Sports Reference
Pelota Binaria (Venezuelan Winter League)

1978 births
Living people
Akron Aeros players
Anaheim Angels players
Anglophone Quebec people
Arizona League Angels players
Baseball people from Quebec
Baseball players at the 1999 Pan American Games
Baseball players at the 2008 Summer Olympics
Canadian expatriate baseball players in the United States
Cedar Rapids Kernels players
Edmonton Trappers players
Erie SeaWolves players
Fort Scott Greyhounds baseball players
Lake Elsinore Storm players
Lehigh Valley IronPigs players
Major League Baseball pitchers
Major League Baseball players from Canada
Navegantes del Magallanes players
Canadian expatriate baseball players in Venezuela
Norfolk Tides players
Olympic baseball players of Canada
Pan American Games bronze medalists for Canada
Pan American Games medalists in baseball
Québec Capitales players
Salt Lake Stingers players
Sportspeople from Longueuil
Toledo Mud Hens players
World Baseball Classic players of Canada
2006 World Baseball Classic players
2009 World Baseball Classic players
Medalists at the 1999 Pan American Games